Batangas's 2nd congressional district is one of the six congressional districts of the Philippines in the province of Batangas. It has been represented in the House of Representatives of the Philippines since 1916 and earlier in the Philippine Assembly from 1907 to 1916. The district consists of the southern Batangas municipalities of Bauan, Lobo, Mabini, San Luis, San Pascual and Tingloy. It is currently represented in the 19th Congress by Gerville Luistro of Lakas-CMD.

Representation history

Election results

2022

2019

2016

2013

2010

2007

See also
Legislative districts of Batangas

References

Congressional districts of the Philippines
Politics of Batangas
1907 establishments in the Philippines
Congressional districts of Calabarzon